Robert Hansen Betley (February 1, 1940 – April 28, 2020) was an American professional golfer who is best known for having played on the Senior PGA Tour.

Betley was born in Butte, Montana. He attended Weber State University, where he majored in police science and administration. He started playing golf at age 28.

Betley spent most of his regular career years as a club pro. He was known for driving the ball long distances. He was runner-up at the 1986 PGA Club Professional Championship. Through Monday qualifying and sponsor exemptions, he played in a few PGA Tour events during his regular career years. His best showing in a major was a T-47 at the 1987 PGA Championship.

Upon reaching the age of 50 in February 1990, Betley joined the Senior PGA Tour (now known as the PGA Tour Champions). He has more than a dozen top-10 finishes in this venue including a win at the 1993 Bank of Boston Senior Classic. 

Betley died at the age of 80 on April 28, 2020.

Professional wins (6)

Other wins (5)
1976 Arizona Open
1978 Arizona Open
1979 Utah Open
1986 Utah PGA Championship
1990 Colorado Open

Senior PGA Tour wins (1)

Senior PGA Tour playoff record (0–1)

References

External links

American male golfers
PGA Tour Champions golfers
Golfers from Montana
Weber State University alumni
Sportspeople from Butte, Montana
1940 births
2020 deaths